Spartan Cars was a manufacturer of kit cars based in Pinxton, Derbyshire, United Kingdom, which operated from 1973 to 1995. The company was founded by Jim McIntyre.

Steve Beardsall, who had been the production manager, took over in about 1991 and introduced the Spartan Treka, a Jeep style car, which was based on the Ford Fiesta Mk2. Over 4000 kits were produced and they have been exported to over 23 countries.

The main product was an open, 2+2 seater, traditionally styled kit car based at first on the chassis and mechanical components of the Triumph Herald. An aluminium panelled body and glass fibre wings completed the car. As the Triumphs became rarer, and collectable in themselves, a complete new chassis was designed in 1980 to take components from the Ford Cortina Mk III-V.

The Sherwood was an estate car conversion based around the Ford Cortina  but using a new chassis. The rear roof section was detachable to make the car into a pick-up.
 
More unusual was the Starcraft, a six-wheel motor caravan conversion for the Ford Cortina Mk III to V. A new steel chassis took the Cortina's mechanical components and on this was mounted a large body shell which included an overhanging section above the driver and passenger seats. The bonnet area was restyled but the centre section of the Cortina was retained including wiring, instruments and windscreen.

External links
Spartan Owners Club

Kit car manufacturers
Defunct motor vehicle manufacturers of England
Companies based in Derbyshire

• The French Spartan

History of a Spartan Roadster renovation :https://www.thefrenchspartan.com/